Alexander Alexeyevich Kotenkov (born September 23, 1952, village Bely, Leningradsky District, Krasnodar Krai) is a former plenipotentiary representative of the President of the Russian Federation, the Federation Council, former plenipotentiary representative of the President of the Russian Federation in the State Duma, a former member of the Federal Council of the Party of Russian Unity and Accord (PRES).

Born in Krasnodar region in a working-class family.

Master of Sports, a multiple champion of the USSR and Russia in sailing (1971, 1973, 2000, 2001). Member of the Executive Committee of the Russian Olympic Committee. From 2000 to 2008 — President of the Russian Yachting Federation.

References

External links
 Биография Александра Котенкова на сайте biogs.redban.ru
 Биография на сайте Президента Российской Федерации.
 Александр Котенков на «Эхо Москвы»

Living people
1952 births
1st class Active State Councillors of the Russian Federation
People from Krasnodar Krai
Recipients of the Order of Honour (Russia)
Russian jurists
Soviet male sailors (sport)
Russian male sailors (sport)
Recipients of the Order "For Merit to the Fatherland", 4th class
Sportspeople from Krasnodar Krai